The Design Management Europe Award (DME) is a European Design management prize. The DME Award aims to promote the strategic use of design within European businesses. It awards the management and successful implementation of design in their processes and strategies to achieve their business goals. The DME Network consists of 24 partners from 17 different countries that have been organizing the DME Award since 2007.

History

ADMIRE (Award for Design Management Innovating and Reinforcing Enterprises, January 2007 – February 2009) 
The DME Award started off as part of the ADMIRE programme in January 2007. The ADMIRE programme was a 2-year project in the European PRO – INNO programme of the Directorate-General for Enterprise and Industry of the European Commission. The 6.4 million Euro programme addressed the Innovation management agenda of PRO – INNO Europe by raising the awareness of Design Management, in particular amongst European small and medium enterprises, to improve their competitiveness and to boost the European economy in general. It was one of the key project objectives to establish the DME Award. 18 European organisations participated in this programme under the coordination of the City of Eindhoven until the end of the ADMIRE project in February 2009.

DME Organisation (February 2009 – Present)  

The former ADMIRE partners have been organising the DME Award since the end of the funded ADMIRE project on a voluntary basis. The role of these DME partners is to promote and organize the annual DME Award. For this purpose, a DME Award board was elected. The board consists of five representatives from the following organisations:
 PDR/ Cardiff Metropolitan University
 City of Eindhoven 
 European Design Centre 
 Design Austria

The costs of the DME Award ceremony are covered by the hosting cities and entering the Award is free for all participants. The entrants are challenged to represent their Design Management processes, strategies and procedures in poster format. These posters are judged by a jury of internationally recognised Design Management experts.

Judging criteria
The DME judging Criteria are:

 Resources : Level of allocated resources
 Awareness of Benefits : Level of added value through design.
 Planning : Plans, objectives and integration of design.
 Process : The process for the use of design.
 Expertise : Level of employment of internal and external expertise.

Categories

Current categories 
Large Company:
 Open to private companies with 250 employees or more or with an annual turnover in excess of €50,000,000
Medium-sized Company:
 Open to private companies with 50 to 249 employees or with an annual turnover not in excess of €50,000,000
Small Company:
 Open to private companies with 10 to 49 employees and with an annual turnover not in excess of €10,000,000
Micro Company:
 Open to private companies with 9 employees or less and with an annual turnover not in excess of €2,000,000
Public or non–profit organisation (NPO):
 Open to public or non–profit organisations such as charities, government programmes, city councils or schools and colleges
Organisations outside of Europe
 Open to any private companies and public or non-profit organisations operating outside of Europe.

Previous categories 
First time design project (2007–2010):
 This category was specific to SMEs (less than 250 employees and a turnover not in excess of €50,000,000). The purpose of this category was to showcase good examples of organisations managing design for the first time. This could have either come from established organisations or from start – ups.
Design strategy for sustainability (2008–2009):
 This category was open to private companies and public organisations of all sizes. Sustainability relates to design strategies encompassing social responsibility, improving the environment or reducing ecological impact.

DME Award Partners 
In 2011 the DME Award consortium consisted of the following partners:

DME Award Ceremonies
 2007: Essen, Germany
 2008: Cardiff, United Kingdom
 2009: Eindhoven, The Netherlands
 2010: Lisbon, Portugal
 2011: Tallinn, Estonia  
 2012: Paredes, Portugal

DME Award Winners

References  

Design awards
Management awards